The  is group kofun burial mounds located in the Shimoida neighborhood of the city of Iida, Nagano in the Chūbu region of Japan. Thirteen tumuli have been collectively protected as a National Historic Site since 2016.

Outline
In the Shimoina area of southern Nagano prefecture is a group of ancient burial mounds distributed on river terraces of the right bank of the Tenryū River. There were once more than 520 kofun in Iida, of which a total of 22 are collectively called the "Iida Kofun cluster". These tumuli consist of 18 keyhole-shaped and four scallop-shaped  tumuli. The presence of so many of this style of tumuli point to a very strong political and cultural connection to the ancient Yamato kingdom. The Iida tumulus group is presumed to have been built in the middle-late Kofun period in the latter half of the 5th century and the end of the 6th century. During this period, it is postulated that the Iida area was a major horse breeding base for the Yamato kingdom, and the introduction of horses led to the development of inland transportation networks and inter-regional trade, which is reflected in various aspects of each tumulus. Of the group, 11 keyhole-shaped and two scallop-shaped tumulus received National Historic Site designation in 2016.

The burial chamber is a lateral type stone corridor with an entrance to the west, with the total length of 13 meters. The entrance is blocked, but the back wall on the east side has been removed. The length of the chamber itself is 5.7 meters by 2.3 meters, with a  height of 1.7 meters. It was opened in the Edo period, at which time bronze mirrors, beads, rings, horse harnesses, and pottery was excavated, but most of these artifacts have been lost. The neighboring Unsai-ji temple, whose main hall partially encroaches on the tumulus, has preserved a golden ring and two bells from a horse harness. The tumulus was built in the middle of the 6th century. It was designated a Nagano Prefectural Historic Site in 1965.

See also

List of Historic Sites of Japan (Nagano)

References

External links
 Iida City official website 
List of kofun in the vicinity of Iida, which also includes kofun not belonging to the cluster on the official website of Iida City Museum (in Japanese)
Tourist guide training for the Iida Kofun cluster (in Japanese)
Guided tours of the Iida Kofun cluster (in Japanese)

Kofun
History of Nagano Prefecture
Iida, Nagano
Historic Sites of Japan
Archaeological sites in Japan